Johannes ("Hannes") Hopley (born 26 January 1981) is a South African discus thrower, born in Pretoria. His personal best throw is 67.66 metres, achieved in May 2004 in College Station.

Competition record

External links

1981 births
Living people
Sportspeople from Pretoria
South African male discus throwers
South African male shot putters
Athletes (track and field) at the 2004 Summer Olympics
Olympic athletes of South Africa
Athletes (track and field) at the 2006 Commonwealth Games
Commonwealth Games competitors for South Africa
African Games silver medalists for South Africa
African Games medalists in athletics (track and field)
African Games bronze medalists for South Africa
Athletes (track and field) at the 2003 All-Africa Games
Athletes (track and field) at the 2007 All-Africa Games
21st-century South African people
20th-century South African people